Eyre's tunnel or Lisson Grove Tunnel is a short canal tunnel on the Regent's Canal that passes under Lisson Grove in St John's Wood, north London and opened in 1816. It is only 48 metres long. The two other tunnels on the Regent's Canal are Islington Tunnel and Maida Hill Tunnel. Unlike the other tunnels, Eyre's Tunnel has a (now fenced) towpath.

The tunnel was originally known as Eyre's Tunnel due to its passing beneath land belonging to Richard Eyre, a local landowner. Lisson Grove is a more recent usage clearly following the renaming of the road that passes above the tunnel.

External links 
 Canal Tunnels of London London Canal Museum.
 London's three canal tunnels (including Eyre's/Lisson Grove) London Canals.
 Picture of Eyre's tunnel

Canal tunnels in London
Buildings and structures in the City of Westminster
Tunnels completed in 1816
1816 establishments in England